T. M. McNally is an American novelist, and short story writer.

Life
Born May 20, 1961, he was raised in Chicago, Illinois.
He moved to Arizona when he was 15.  He graduated from Rockford College, and Arizona State University. McNally taught literature and writing at Webster University. He currently teaches at Arizona State University Tempe Campus.

Awards
 Faulkner-Wisdom Gold Medal, for The Goat Bridge
 1991 Flannery O'Connor Award for Short Fiction, for Low flying Aircraft
 Yale Review’s Smart Family Foundation Award
 National Endowment for the Arts fellowship
 Howard Foundation fellowships at Brown University
 Pen/Faulkner Award for Fiction finalist

Works

References

External links

 Author website
 "“Describing an Other” – An Interview with T.M. McNally", Greenbelt Review, Issue 2 : Summer/Fall 2005, Ben Kamper

Writers from Chicago
20th-century American novelists
21st-century American novelists
American male novelists
Arizona State University faculty
Arizona State University alumni
1969 births
Living people
Novelists from Arizona
American male short story writers
20th-century American short story writers
21st-century American short story writers
PEN/Faulkner Award for Fiction winners
20th-century American male writers
21st-century American male writers
Novelists from Illinois